Proof School is a secondary school in San Francisco that offers a mathematics-focused liberal arts education. Currently, 118 students in grades 6–12 are enrolled in Proof School for the academic year (2022-2023).

The school was co-founded by Dennis Leary, Ian Brown, and Paul Zeitz, the chair of mathematics at University of San Francisco. The school opened in the fall of 2015 with 45 students in grades 6–10. The curriculum is inspired by math circles, which emphasizes communication and working together to solve math problems.

Academics
 

Proof School is a full-curriculum day school that emphasizes communication, collaboration, and problem-solving. The school is accredited by Western Association of Schools and Colleges.

The school year is divided into 5 blocks, each of which consists of 6 normal academic weeks and a build week.

Each student has 5 courses: 4 morning courses that vary across grades, and a math class. The morning courses meet twice a week for 80 minutes per class. The math courses meet for two hours and ten minutes every day in the afternoon.

The (non-post-calculus) math classes focus on a different subject each block: Block 1 varies depending on grade, Block 2 is Algebra, Block 3 is Geometry, Block 4 is Algebra and Pre-Calculus, and Block 5 is Number Theory.

Teams and clubs 

Proof School currently has a number of internal clubs, as well as a Zero Robotics team called Proof Robotics. The team qualified for the competition finals and is the leading member of the alliance Hit or Miss with the following teams: Crab Nebula from Liveo Cecioni in Livorno, Italy and Rock Rovers from Council Rock High School South in Holland, PA, USA. Hit or Miss placed 2nd place internationally and performed one of the first satellite hookings aboard the ISS.

References

Private schools in California
Schools in San Francisco
Mathematics education in the United States
2015 establishments in California